State Route 195 (SR 195) is a  state highway in the southwestern part of the U.S. state of Georgia. It runs south-to-north through portions of Lee and Sumter counties.

Route description
SR 195 begins at an intersection with SR 32 (Main Street East) in Leesburg, in Lee County. It heads northeast from Leesburg to an intersection with SR 377 (Lee Street). It then curves to the north and enters Sumter County. Shortly after entering the county, it reaches Leslie. There, it intersects SR 118 (West Allen Street). After that is US 280/SR 30. The three highways run concurrent east to nearby De Soto. It runs north through rural parts of the county, broken up by SR 27 (Vienna Road), until it meets it northern terminus, an intersection with SR 49 southeast of Andersonville.

Major intersections

See also

References

External links

 
 Georgia Roads (Routes 181 - 200)

195
Transportation in Lee County, Georgia
Transportation in Sumter County, Georgia